Tudor Sports Ground is a public park between Clifford Road and the East Coast Main Railway Line in New Barnet in the London Borough of Barnet. It is one of Barnet's 'Premier Parks'.

The park is a large grassed area with scattered mature trees. The site is mainly devoted to a nine-hole 'pitch and pay' golf course, and it also has a cricket pitch, a tennis court, a basketball shooting area, children's playgrounds and a car park.

The park is adjacent to Monken Hadley Common on its northern side, and a footpath next to the railway on its eastern edge runs between Monken Hadley Common and New Barnet railway station.

See also

 Barnet parks and open spaces

External links 

 London Borough of Barnet, Tudor Sports Ground
 Kids Fun London, Tudor Sports Centre and Park

References

Parks and open spaces in the London Borough of Barnet